John Chishull or John de Chishull (died 1280) was Lord Chancellor of England, Bishop of London, and Lord High Treasurer during the 13th century. He also served as Dean of St Paul's.

Life

Chishull was made rector of St Mary's Church, the parish church of Broadwater in Sussex (now part of the town of Worthing) in 1259.

Appointed as a King's Clerk in 1251, he was selected as Chancellor of the Exchequer in November 1263 and served until 25 February 1264. He also served as acting treasurer in November 1263. On 30 October 1268 he was reappointed Chancellor, serving until 29 July 1269. On 6 February 1270 he was appointed Treasurer and served in that office until 9 June 1271.

Chishull held the prebend of Chamberlainwood in the diocese of London before he had the office of Archdeacon of London. He was archdeacon by 15 January 1263. He was then appointed Provost of Beverley Minster from 1265 to 1274 and Dean of St Paul's in London between August and October 1268.

Chishull was elected bishop on 7 December 1273, confirmed 15 March, and consecrated on 29 April 1274.

Chishull died on 7 February 1280. There was a tomb memorial to him in the quire at Old St Paul's Cathedral.

Citations

References
 
 
 
 

Lord chancellors of England
Lord High Treasurers of England
Bishops of London
Deans of St Paul's
Archdeacons of London
Year of birth missing
1280 deaths
13th-century English Roman Catholic bishops